Edler is an unincorporated community in Baca County, Colorado, United States. Edler is located in southern Baca County, Colorado, and was settled in the early 20th century. Named after a Doctor Edler, who was an early settler, Edler once had a school, post office, stores, and church.

Geography
Edler is located within the Comanche National Grassland in southern Baca County. It is located at the junction of County Road P and County Road 17.

History

Edler was named for Dr. Edler, one of the first homesteaders in the community. 

Edler's post office was established in 1916. Edler was two miles northwest of Holmes City.

In the 1920s, Edler had two mercantiles and a blacksmith shop. The Edler area was noted for its dairy industry, and two cream stations had been established in Edler.

In the 1930s, the community of Edler was the location of several petroleum test sites. In 1936, William A. Arbuthnot organized the Edler Grange. The Edler Grange was #426. 

In 1940, Edler's population was 24. The Edler post office, which had operated in the community for more than 30 years, closed in 1948.

By the 1950s, there was a school and bus barn and the Edler Community Church. Edler's population was 30 in 1960.

By the 1990s, Edler was stated to be "surrounded by sand sagebrush, yucca, blue grama, buffalo grass, side-oats grama, and red threeawn. The population is 25."

References

See also
 List of cities and towns in Colorado

Unincorporated communities in Baca County, Colorado
Unincorporated communities in Colorado